Stink most commonly refers to unpleasant odor.

The term may also refer to:
Stink (EP), an EP by The Replacements
Flatulence, sometimes called a stink
Stink bomb, a device to create an unpleasant smell
Stink bug, a type of insect
 Stink pipe, a slang term for part of a Drain-waste-vent system
 Stink!, a 2015 documentary film
Stink, a character from the 1991 version of Land of the Lost

See also
Stinker (disambiguation)
Stinking (disambiguation)
Stinky (disambiguation)